Lance Evans Harvell (born 1963) is an American politician from Maine. A Republican, Harvell was elected to the Maine House of Representatives on February 3, 2009, during a special election to replace Janet T. Mills. He was re-elected in 2010 and 2012. He is a service operator at Verso Paper's paper mill in Jay.

Harvell is a graduate of Mount Blue High School (class of 1981) and has taken courses at the University of Maine at Farmington. He is married with two children.

References

1963 births
Living people
People from Farmington, Maine
Republican Party members of the Maine House of Representatives
University of Maine at Farmington alumni